Paul Gavin Johnson CBE (born 5 January 1967) is a British economist and civil servant, currently serving as Director of the Institute for Fiscal Studies, a member of the Committee on Climate Change, and a visiting professor in Economics at the Department of Economics, University College London.

Life

The son of Robert and Joy Johnson, he was educated at Kings Manor School, Shoreham-by-Sea, then at Keble College, Oxford, where he held a college scholarship and gained a First in Politics, Philosophy, and Economics, and finally at Birkbeck College, London, where he graduated with an MSc in Economics.

His first job was at the Institute for Fiscal Studies, where he remained from 1988 to 1998, in the last two years serving as a deputy director. From September 1998 to January 1999 he was an advisor on pensions and welfare reform in the Cabinet Office. He was then briefly head of Economies of Financial Regulation at the Financial Services Authority, 1999–2000, then transferred as Chief Economist and Director of Analytical Services to the Department for Education and Employment, soon renamed as the Department for Education and Skills, remaining until 2004. That year he went to HM Treasury as Director of Public Services and Chief Micro-Economist, continuing in post until 2007. He was also deputy head of the Government Economic Service from 2005 to 2007. In 2007 he returned to the Institute for Fiscal Studies as a research fellow, and in 2011 was appointed as its Director.

Johnson was also a Member of the Economic and Social Research Council from 2002 to 2007 and a Senior Associate of Frontier Economics Ltd from 2007 to 2011.

He has served as a visiting professor in the Economics department of University College London since 2013, as a member of the British government's Committee on Climate Change since 2012, and as a member of the Actuarial Council.

In the 2018 Queen's birthday honours list, Johnson was awarded a CBE for services to the social sciences and economics.

Views
Johnson stated in November 2022 the government was “reaping the costs of a long-term failure to grow the economy”, together with an ageing population and high borrowing levels.  Johnson maintained the nation became much poorer, conditions were, he maintained worse than necessary due to “a series of economic own goals.”  Johnson stated “own goals” included “reducing investment spending” and reduced spending on vocational and further education.  Johnson maintained Brexit was economically damaging.  Johnson said.  the September 2022 United Kingdom mini-budget was obviously unhelpful.

Private life
Johnson has four sons with economist Lorraine Dearden. In 2016, they were living in Highgate.

Selected publications
Inequality in the UK (contributor), 1996
Pension Systems and Retirement Incomes Across OECD Countries (contributor), 2001
Tax by Design: the Mirrless review (editor), 2011
Follow the Money: How Much Does Britain Cost? (author), Abacus Books, 2023

Notes

1967 births
British economists
Alumni of Keble College, Oxford
Living people